William Colston Leigh Sr. (August 7, 1901 – July 19, 1992) created one of the world's leading speakers' agencies, the W. Colston Leigh Bureau.

Biography
He was the son of painter William R. Leigh, born at New York City, and was raised in Portsmouth, Virginia. Prior to establishing the W. Colston Leigh Bureau in 1929, he tried his hand at a number of different roles, including scrap sorter, night watchman and tango teacher. Prior to coming to New York City, he was offered a college baseball scholarship in Georgia – an offer he turned down in order to make an unsuccessful attempt to break into opera as a singer.

After trying a number of occupations, he started the W. Colston Leigh Bureau in 1929, which still operates in Somerville, New Jersey.  Among its notable clients were Eleanor Roosevelt, Edward R. Murrow, Clement Attlee, William L. Shirer, Jim Thorpe, Art Buchwald, Will Durant, Indira Gandhi, and James A. Michener.

After an unsuccessful marriage to Helen M. Cady, he married Ardis Neff on August 20, 1946. He has a son, William Colston Leigh Jr. He died in 1992 in Tampa, Florida.

References

External links
Official website of Leigh Bureau

1901 births
1992 deaths
Businesspeople from New York City
People from Portsmouth, Virginia
Death in Florida
20th-century American businesspeople